Eucalyptus fraxinoides, commonly known as the white ash or white mountain ash, is a medium-sized to tall tree of mountain country and is endemic to south eastern Australia. It has rough, compacted greyish bark on the lower trunk, smooth white bark with scribbles above, lance-shaped adult leaves, flower buds in groups of between seven and eleven, white flowers and barrel-shaped or urn-shaped fruit.

Description
It has rough, greyish, short fibrous bark on the lower trunk, smooth white, grey or yellow bark with insect scribbles above. Flowering occurs from December to February and the flowers are white.

Taxonomy and naming
Eucalyptus fraxinoides was first formally described in 1898 by Henry Deane and Joseph Maiden from specimens they collected with William Bäuerlen on Tantawangalo Mountain near Cathcart. The description was published in Proceedings of the Linnean Society of New South Wales.<ref name="Deane">{{cite journal |last1=Deane |first1=Henry |last2=Maiden |first2=Joseph |title=On the White Ash of Southern New South Wales |journal=Proceedings of the Linnean Society of New South Wales |date=1898 |volume=23 |issue=3 |pages=412–413 |url=https://www.biodiversitylibrary.org/item/21753#page/436/mode/1up}}</ref> The specific epithet (fraxinoides) refers to a perceived similarity to trees in the genus Fraxinus. (The suffix -oides means "likeness" in Latin.) Fraxinus americana'' is also known as white ash.

Distribution and habitat
White ash grows in cool, moist forest on mountain ranges near the coast and on the tablelands of southern New South Wales and far north-eastern Victoria where it often grows in pure stands. In New South Wales it is found south from Sassafras near Tianjara and in Victoria it is confined to the Howe Range near Mallacoota.

References

fraxinoides
Myrtales of Australia
Flora of New South Wales
Flora of Victoria (Australia)
Plants described in 1898
Taxa named by Henry Deane (engineer)
Taxa named by Joseph Maiden